The Marble-toothed snake-eel (Pisodonophis daspilotus, also known as the Blunt-toothed snake eel) is an eel in the family Ophichthidae (worm/snake eels). It was described by Charles Henry Gilbert in 1898. It is a marine, tropical eel which is known from the eastern central and southeastern Pacific Ocean, including Costa Rica, Colombia, Panama and Ecuador.

The IUCN redlist currently lists the Marble-toothed snake eel as Near Threatened, due to the decline in mangroves in its range of habitat. The population of the Marble-toothed snake eel is estimated to have declined by 25% over a course of 10–15 years.

References

Ophichthidae
Fish described in 1898